Prince Charles of Luxembourg (Charles Jean Philippe Joseph Marie Guillaume; born 10 May 2020) is the only child of Hereditary Grand Duke Guillaume and Hereditary Grand Duchess Stéphanie. He was born at Grand Duchess Charlotte Maternity Hospital in Luxembourg City. He is second in the line of succession to the throne of Luxembourg. His birth was celebrated by a 21-gun salute at Fort Thungen in Kirchberg.

On 19 September 2020, Prince Charles was baptised at the Abbey of St. Maurice and St. Maurus of Clervaux in Luxembourg. His godparents are his maternal aunt Countess Gaëlle de Lannoy and his paternal uncle Prince Louis of Luxembourg.

References

External links
 Prince Charles - Official website of the Grand Ducal Palace

2020 births
Living people
People from Luxembourg City
Royal children
House of Luxembourg-Nassau
Princes of Nassau
Princes of Bourbon-Parma
Luxembourgian people of Cuban descent